Kim Allan is a New Zealand-based ultramarathoner. At the age of 47 on 22 November 2012 she attempted to complete a 500 km Ultramarathon with no sleep around the Sri Chinmoy Peace Mile at Auckland Domain, raising money for the New Zealand Spinal Trust and the Catwalk Spinal Cord Injury Trust.  According to her Facebook page, she only managed 385.8 km.

However, Allan followed up at the International Association of Ultrarunners (IAU) 24 Hour World Championship in Steenbergen, Netherlands on 11 & 12 May 2013 by accomplishing 203.919 km in the 24 hour period, for 39th placed woman and 1st New Zealand woman.

In December 2013 Allan ran for 86 hours, 11 minutes and 9 seconds without sleeping, according to event co-manager Mark Stone. In that run she broke the previous women's world record of running without sleep (which was 486 kilometers) reaching 500 kilometers. She was running to support the New Zealand Spinal Trust.

References

External links
Sleepless 500km run for charity
Two feet, 500km and no sleep for charity
World Championship - Overall Results (Men/Women)

Year of birth missing (living people)
Living people
New Zealand female long-distance runners
Female ultramarathon runners
New Zealand female marathon runners
New Zealand ultramarathon runners